Emelia J. Benjamin is an American cardiologist and researcher. She is a professor of medicine at the Boston University School of Medicine, Professor of Epidemiology at the Boston University School of Public Health, and also a practicing cardiologist at Boston Medical Center.

Benjamin is author of over 800 peer-reviewed publications. She is one of most cited investigators in clinical cardiology with over 330,000 citations and an h-index of 200.

The American Heart Association named her the 2022 Distinguished Scientist.

References

External links

PubMed search for Emelia Benjamin

Living people
Boston University School of Medicine faculty
Case Western Reserve University School of Medicine alumni
Harvard School of Public Health alumni
American cardiologists
Women cardiologists
Physicians from Massachusetts
Year of birth missing (living people)
Boston University School of Public Health faculty

Fellows of the American Heart Association